Alfred James Dark (21 August 1893 – 3 August 1964) was an English footballer who played at half-back for Newcastle United, Leeds United, Port Vale, Halifax Town, Barrow, Sittingbourne, and North Shields

Career
Dark played for Wallsend and Newcastle United, before being signed by Leeds United in May 1921. He made his debut in the English Football League at the age of 29 on 28 October 1922, in a 2-1 defeat at Leicester City. He was unable to dislodge Jim Baker or Ernie Hart in the Leeds first-team. He signed with Port Vale in June 1923. He scored on his debut on 25 August, in a 2–1 victory over Crystal Palace at the Nest. He was regularly on the first team team sheet from August 1923 to February 1924, but was faded out of favour at The Old Recreation Ground and released at the end of the season. He had played 25 Second Division games and one FA Cup game. He moved on to Halifax Town, Barrow, Sittingbourne and North Shields.

Career statistics
Source:

References

People from Keynsham
English footballers
Association football midfielders
Newcastle United F.C. players
Leeds United F.C. players
Port Vale F.C. players
Halifax Town A.F.C. players
Barrow A.F.C. players
Sittingbourne F.C. players
North Shields F.C. players
English Football League players
1893 births
1964 deaths